Port Ivory is a coastal area in the northwestern corner of Staten Island, New York City, New York, United States.  It is located on Newark Bay near the entrances the Kill van Kull in the east and  Arthur Kill in the west. It is bordered by Arlington to the east, Old Place to the south, Newark Bay to the north, and the Arthur Kill to the west.

The area bore the name of Milliken originally, and became locally known as Port Ivory after Ivory Soap, one of the best-known products from Procter & Gamble, which operated a factory at the site from 1907 until 1991, when the soap making operation was moved to Mexico.  Located nearby is the Howland Hook Marine Terminal.  The Port Authority of New York and New Jersey which leases the Howland Hook facility is contracting out the construction of an intermodal rail yard using part of the former Ivory Soap factory site to help with ship to rail transshipment.

Another transportation resource is the North Shore branch of the Staten Island Railway, which crosses the Arthur Kill on its own Arthur Kill Vertical Lift Bridge, adjacent and parallel to the Goethals Bridge, and eventually reaches Cranford Junction, New Jersey.  However, passenger trains stopped serving the Port Ivory (formerly Milliken) station several years before passenger service on the branch as a whole ceased in 1953, and freight activity on the line became rare by the 1970s and nonexistent by the beginning of the 1990s.  Efforts to restore the freight service by the New York City Economic Development Corporation were completed in June 2006. The Arlington Yard re-built connected to the new ExpressRail terminal at the marine terminal.

The Staten Island Expressway is sometimes cited as Port Ivory's southern boundary. The island's (and New York City's) lone mobile home park is on Goethals Road North, a service road of the expressway; the only other residents of the heavily industrial neighborhood live in a few older single-family homes a short distance to the east, along Forest Avenue.

References

External links 
 
 Procter & Gamble

Procter & Gamble
Neighborhoods in Staten Island